Aethes citreoflava is a species of moth of the family Tortricidae. It is found in China (Heilongjiang, Jilin), Japan, Korea, Russia (Amur, Ussuriysk) and Mongolia.

References

citreoflava
Moths described in 1966
Moths of Asia
Moths of Japan
Moths of Korea